The men's pentathlon at the 2011 IPC Athletics World Championships was held at the QEII Stadium on 25 January

Classification P11−13: visual impairment

Medalists

Results

Long jump

Javelin throw

100 metres

Discus throw

1500 metres

Final standings

See also
List of IPC world records in athletics

References
General
Schedule and results, Official site of the 2011 IPC Athletics World Championships
IPC Athletics Classification Explained, Scottish Disability Sport
Specific

Pentathlon
Athletics pentathlon